From Luxury to Heartache is the fourth album by the British pop group Culture Club, released in April 1986. It was the last studio album released by Culture Club until 1999's Don't Mind If I Do.

Background
From Luxury to Heartache was produced by veteran pop and R&B producer Arif Mardin, who replaced Steve Levine, the producer of Culture Club's previous three albums, in a bid to revitalise the band's sound. Due to lead singer Boy George's growing addiction to drugs, recordings dragged on for so long that Mardin had to disband the sessions and leave it up to engineer Lew Hahn to record the final vocals. The final credit on the album gave production credit to both Mardin and Hahn on all tracks. Songs like "Gusto Blusto" and "Reasons" took days for the addicted singer to finish.

Following the release of the album, rumours of George's heroin addiction began to circulate in the press and in British and US tabloids, and by the summer of 1986, he announced that he was indeed addicted to drugs. In July, he was arrested for possession of cannabis. Several days later, keyboardist Michael Rudetsky, who played on the album and had co-written "Sexuality" with George, was found dead from a heroin overdose in George's home.

Commercial performance and single releases
Lead single "Move Away" became a hit in several countries around the world. However, also around this time, media reports of lead singer Boy George's drug abuse were starting to surface from the media. "God Thank You Woman" was the second single released from the album in Europe and Asia, it peaked at number 31 on the UK Singles Chart, while in North and South America "Gusto Blusto" was chosen as a single, but it failed to chart on the US Hot 100. A fourth single, "Heaven's Children", was planned to be released in July 1986, but was cancelled. Within a year of the album's release, the band broke up and Boy George embarked on a solo career, making this the last Culture Club album until 1999's Don't Mind If I Do.

Track listing

CD bonus tracks:

"Move Away" (Extended) – 7:25
 "God Thank You Woman" (Extended) – 7:03
 "Sexuality" (Extended) – 10:34

Personnel

Culture Club
 Boy George – vocals
 Mikey Craig – bass guitar
 Roy Hay – guitar, piano, keyboards, sitar, electric sitar
 Jon Moss – percussion, drums

Additional musicians
 Michael Rudetsky – keyboards
 Phil Pickett – keyboards, background vocals
 Lewis Hahn – recorder
 Helen Terry – backing vocals
 Jocelyn Brown – backing vocals
 David Lasley – backing vocals
 Wendell Morrison – backing vocals
 Ruby Turner – backing vocals

Production
 Arif Mardin – producer
 Lewis Hahn – producer, mixing
 George Marino – mastering
 Jon Moss – digital mixing
 Michael O'Reilly – engineer
 Martin Pearson – engineer
 David Richards – engineer
 Tony Gordon – management

Charts

Album

Singles

Release details

References

External links
 Amazon.com review
 Artist Direct review
 Buy.com review
 Rate Your Music review

1986 albums
Culture Club albums
Virgin Records albums
Epic Records albums
Albums produced by Arif Mardin